Ardlussa is a hamlet and estate on The Long Road, just north of the Lussa River, overlooking Ardlussa Bay on the east coast of the island of Jura, in the council area of Argyll and Bute, Scotland. Estate buildings line the road, and the area features semi-natural woodland.
Ardlussa is the home of Lussa Gin.

History 
The name "Ardlussa" is Gaelic/Norse and means "The point on the Lussa".

References

External links

Hamlets in Argyll and Bute
Villages on Jura, Scotland